National Secondary Route 123, or just Route 123 (or ) is a National Road Route of Costa Rica, located in the Alajuela, Heredia provinces.

Description
In Alajuela province the route covers Alajuela canton (Alajuela, Desamparados districts).

In Heredia province the route covers Santa Bárbara canton (Santa Bárbara, San Pedro, San Juan districts), Flores canton (San Joaquín, Barrantes, Llorente districts).

References

Highways in Costa Rica